István Farkas (born 16 June 1984 in Kecskemét) is a Hungarian football player.

Coaching career
Farkas decided to retire at the end of the 2018–19 season. Kecskeméti LC announced, that Farkas would stay at the club as a coach.

References

External links
Player profile at HLSZ 

1984 births
Living people
People from Kecskemét
Hungarian footballers
Association football defenders
Kecskeméti TE players
Ceglédi VSE footballers
Nemzeti Bajnokság I players
Nemzeti Bajnokság II players
Sportspeople from Bács-Kiskun County